The Rex Theatre building is located at 714 Lalonde Street in Whitewood, Saskatchewan, Canada.   The building is a designated Heritage Property.  Originally built to house the Merchant's Bank, the building was later used to house the Theatre, with the removal of the second story the building was adapted to house a telephone exchange, later a retail outlet and finally a museum.  The building currently houses the Whitewood Historical Museum.

References 

- Whitewood Historical Museum - Museum Association of Saskatchewan

Theatres completed in 1907
Whitewood, Saskatchewan
Former cinemas in Canada
Local museums in Canada
Cinemas and movie theatres in Saskatchewan
Museums in Saskatchewan
Historic bank buildings in Canada
Heritage sites in Saskatchewan
1907 establishments in Saskatchewan